Elmwood Park may refer to:
 Elmwood Park, Edmonton, Canada
 Elmwood Park, Illinois
 Elmwood Park High School (Illinois)
 Elmwood Park, New Jersey
 Elmwood Park Public Schools
Elmwood Park (Omaha), a neighborhood in Omaha, Nebraska
Elmwood Park (Syracuse, New York)
Elmwood Park, Philadelphia, Pennsylvania
Elmwood Park Zoo, in Norristown, Pennsylvania
Elmwood Park, Columbia, South Carolina
 Elmwood Park, Wisconsin